The Expo Line is the oldest line of the SkyTrain rapid transit system in the Metro Vancouver region of British Columbia, Canada. The line is owned and operated by BC Rapid Transit Company, a subsidiary of TransLink, and links the cities of Vancouver, Burnaby, New Westminster and Surrey.

The line was originally known only as "the SkyTrain" from its inception in 1985 until 2002, as it was the system's only line during this time. In 2002, after the opening of the system's second line, the Millennium Line, the original line was given the name "Expo Line". The new name was in recognition of Expo 86 (the World's Fair that Vancouver hosted in 1986) as the transit system had been built in large part as a showcase and an attraction for that fair.

Route

The line is elevated from Stadium–Chinatown to New Westminster stations, except for short at-grade sections between Nanaimo and Joyce–Collingwood stations in East Vancouver, and around the SkyTrain yards at Edmonds station in Burnaby.

The line travels underground for a short stretch between New Westminster and Columbia stations. Just east of Columbia is a junction where the line splits. One branch crosses the Fraser River, via the SkyBridge, and is elevated for the rest of its run through Surrey, with King George as its terminus station. The other branch continues through New Westminster, first through a tunnel and then elevated until it terminates at Production Way–University in Burnaby.

From just west of Nanaimo station all the way to New Westminster station, the Expo Line follows BC Electric's former Central Park Line, which carried interurbans between Vancouver and New Westminster from 1890 to the early 1950s.

History

ICTS demonstration project (1983)
What is now known as SkyTrain began as a demonstration project to showcase the newly developed linear induction propulsion technology to Vancouver and other prospective cities throughout the world. Although Toronto's Scarborough RT was completed before the Expo Line in 1985, the ICTS demonstration was the first system to use SkyTrain technology. The Intermediate Capacity Transit System (ICTS) demonstration was built using the Advanced Rapid Transit (ART) technology developed by the Urban Transportation Development Corporation (now part of Bombardier). Construction began on March 1, 1982, and was completed in early 1983. The demonstration project consisted of just one station and about one kilometre of guideway with no switches. This original station was not "named" during this time as it was the only station, but then in 1985 opened as Main Street station.

As it was a showcase station, Main Street had a different initial design from other stations on the Expo Line that came after it. For example, glass was featured in the station's design, but was missing from other original Expo Line stations, except Stadium station (now Stadium–Chinatown) since it was tied to the Expo grounds. Having preceded other stations on the line by three years, Main Street–Science World was visibly older, and signs of rust and wear were showing before extensive renovations to the station were completed in 2014.

The guideway for the showcase line was a straight section east of the station running over Terminal Avenue. It ended across from where the former Brussels Chocolate factory once was, located on Terminal. There was no guideway west of the station as the track ended immediately at the west end of the platform where the Vancity head office now stands.

The ICTS guideway was built differently from the rest of the Expo Line. The columns were different especially with how they are joined with the guideway. The walkway between the two tracks is of a different but also inferior design from the Expo Line, and it is showing signs of rust that come with the older age of the guideway.

There was only a single two-car train running on the north westbound track. After passengers boarded, it ran east toward the end of the test guideway. At the eastern end, the train would stop and after a pause, reverse directions and return to the station. Since there were no switches, only the northern track was used and the train would run back and forth on the same track. There was also a single car mock up parked on the south platform, what is now the eastbound platform.  This car was not operational. The two-car train and single car mock up were of a different and unique design to all the production Mark I trains. The red tail lights were located on the bottom beside the headlights, instead of at the top. The end door and window were of a different design. As well, there were black panels on either side of the door, that are not found in the production trains. The whereabouts of these trains is unknown.

The ICTS guideway was retrofitted during the construction of the Millennium Line to accommodate the heavier weight Mark II cars. This was done by adding additional steel-reinforced concrete beams to the columns where they support the guideway. These are clearly visible when driving or walking on Terminal Avenue under the guideway. With the exception of the original ICTS guideway, no other part of the Expo Line required retrofitting for strength in order to accommodate the Mark II cars.

After the 1983 preview closed, the single pair of demonstration cars were sent back to Ontario, which have since served as test trains for the UTDC. The subsequent trains ordered for Expo were designed slightly differently from the demo train set because of issues such as a lack of standardized parts, and the wish to introduce automated computer technology to drive the trains.

Phase I: Waterfront to New Westminster (1985)

Following the demonstration project, construction of the first phase of the Expo Line between Vancouver and New Westminster got under way in mid-1983, with guideway construction nearing completion by late 1984, and station construction beginning in early 1985. On December 11, 1985, SkyTrain began providing free weekend service, with full revenue service opening on January 3, 1986. The newly built system had limited Sunday service until 1990, and shorter revenue hours during weekdays than SkyTrain's current revenue schedule as of 2010.

During Expo 86, special shuttle trains ran from a third track at Stadium station, where there was a connection to the monorail serving the main site of the world's fair, to the Canadian pavilion at Waterfront station. Waterfront station was divided in two, with a fence going down the centre of the platform. One side of the platform was used exclusively for the shuttles, and was accessible only from the Canada Place entrance, while the other side was only for revenue service and was only accessible from the main entrance to the east.

For the first few years of revenue service until the early 1990s, all trains were lined with carpeting, and train doors did not open automatically but rather at the push of buttons on the interior and exterior of the trains when docked in stations. This on-demand system reflected the small-scale ridership SkyTrain had before Vancouver experienced a major population boost. Due to an inability to steadily maintain the carpeting, wax floors of the same colour were installed between 1992 and 1993.

In the planning of the original line, a proposed future station at Boundary Road and Kingsway, or "Boundary station" was to be included to serve employees of BCTel. However, the proposal was scrapped largely due to a fear of the station attracting crime to the neighbourhood and noise-level concerns.

Phase II: Columbia and Scott Road stations (1989–1990)
The first extension, or Phase II, was split into two parts. Construction began in 1987, with Columbia station opening on February 14, 1989, adding  of guideway in the City of New Westminster. The second segment opened on March 16, 1990, and included Scott Road station in Surrey, crossing the Fraser River via the purpose-built, cable-stayed "SkyBridge", adding  to the line.

Phase III: Surrey City Centre extension (1994)

Construction of a  second extension, or Phase III, began in late 1991 and opened on March 28, 1994, adding three stations in Surrey's City Centre district in Whalley. Private partnerships with surrounding businesses in the community led to the then-new stations having a different appearance from the rest of the Expo Line. This extension set one of the Expo Line's current eastern terminus at King George station. It also added Gateway and Surrey Central stations.

Branch to Production Way–University (2016)
In 2002, the Millennium Line opened and shared the same track alignment with the Expo Line from Waterfront station in Downtown Vancouver to Columbia station in New Westminster. At Columbia, the two lines diverged, with the Expo Line crossing the Fraser River towards Surrey City Centre and the Millennium Line entering a short tunnel towards northeastern New Westminster and North Burnaby.

In late 2016, the SkyTrain system underwent a service change in preparation for the opening of the Evergreen Extension, resulting in a new branch of the Expo Line serving four stations that were originally built for the Millennium Line. On October 22, 2016, this branch began service from Columbia to Sapperton, Braid, Lougheed Town Centre, and Production Way–University stations, while the Millennium Line began running between VCC–Clark and Lougheed Town Centre (and later, Lafarge Lake–Douglas) stations, effectively ending nearly 15 years of Millennium Line service between Waterfront and Braid. The main Expo Line service between Waterfront and King George stations remained in place, operating at the same frequency levels.

Expansions

Capacity upgrades
Ridership on the Expo Line is continually increasing, and plans are being developed for upgrading capacity to meet future ridership levels. Several options are being considered and/or planned, including:
 Purchasing middle "C" cars to use with some of the Mark II/III train sets to maximize available platform space. Current platforms can fit six-car Mark I trains and five-car Mark II/III trains. Six-car Mark I trains are more increasingly being used, but TransLink can only create two- and four-car Mark II trains with its fleet (2 or 2+2). By adding a middle "C" car to some Mark II/III couplets to create three-car trainsets, longer five-car trains can be used (2+3). As of December 2016, only the Mark-III vehicles employ the use of the middle "C" car, creating a four-car train. 
 Operating headway between trains during peak times is maintained at 108 seconds. SkyTrain can run at 75 second headways, which will allow for more trains to operate at peak times.
 After using longer trains and running trains at 75-second headways, the next option is to lengthen the station platforms to accommodate longer trains. This expansion option will be the most expensive as it will require heavy construction at all Expo Line stations.

Surrey–Langley extension
The 2008 Provincial Transit Plan included a  extension of the Expo Line from King George station in Surrey east to Guildford, then along 152 Street to Fraser Highway and southeast to 168 Street; a further extension to Willowbrook Shopping Centre in Langley Township was also included in the plan. In 2011, as part of phase 2 of the Surrey Rapid Transit Study, different possibilities were examined for expanding rapid transit along multiple corridors in the South of Fraser region. In addition to SkyTrain, light rail and bus rapid transit were also in consideration. In 2016, TransLink was building dual business cases for LRT and SkyTrain technologies.

In November 2018, following a change of government in Surrey, the Metro Vancouver Mayors' Council voted to indefinitely suspend the at-grade Surrey light rail project in favour of extending the Expo Line from King George station to Langley City. The $1.65 billion in funding that was earmarked for the light rail project was intended to be used to construct part of this extension to Langley but was insufficient to fund the entire extension, with $1.9 billion more needed to complete the project. The existing funding would extend the line  to Fleetwood in Surrey and add 4 new stations, terminating at 166th Street.

On July 25, 2019, the Mayors' Council voted to extend the Expo Line to Fleetwood using the existing funds. The council also voted to proceed with preparing a detailed business case for the full Surrey–Langley SkyTrain extension, which was expected to be completed by early 2020. If approved by the end of the third quarter of 2020, construction would have started in early 2022, with revenue service to Fleetwood projected to have started in late 2025.

On October 8, 2020, during the 2020 provincial election campaign, the BC NDP pledged to work with senior levels of government to obtain the $1.5billion needed to complete the full extension to Langley.

On July 9, 2021, Prime Minister Justin Trudeau announced that the federal government would provide up to $1.3billion to build the SkyTrain extension to Langley in a single phase. At that time, the cost of the project was estimated between $3.8 and $3.95billion in total, more than $650million in excess of the earlier $3.13billion estimate from TransLink, with the rest of the funding being split between TransLink and the provincial government. The full extension to Langley was planned to be constructed as a single project rather than in two phases and is scheduled to open in 2028. In July 2022, the provincial government officially approved this one-phase plan. Procurement for contractors was slated to start later in 2022, with major construction expected to begin in 2024.

Stations

See also
 SkyTrain rolling stock

Notes

References

External links

TransLink – The organization that owns SkyTrain
B.C. Rapid Transit Company Ltd. – The subsidiary of Translink that operates and maintains SkyTrain

Expo Line (SkyTrain)
Railway lines opened in 1985
1985 establishments in British Columbia
Transport in Burnaby
Transport in New Westminster
Transport in Surrey, British Columbia
Expo 86
Rapid transit lines in Canada